Menino Deus (meaning Divine Infant in English) is a neighborhood of the city of Porto Alegre, the state capital of Rio Grande do Sul in Brazil.

The neighborhood was created by Law 2022 of December 7, 1959.

Demographics
Population: 29,577 2000''
Area: 215 hectares
Density: 138 hab/ha/km²
Number of housing units 11,495

Famous people
 Caio Fernando Abreu, writer.

See also
Neighborhoods of Porto Alegre

References

External links
Porto Alegre Homepage
Bairros Porto Alegre - Nosbairros

Neighbourhoods in Porto Alegre
Populated places established in 1959